Fever for da Flavor is the debut studio album by the American R&B group H-Town released in 1993 on Luke Records. The group gained popularity in America when the lead single from their debut; "Knockin' da Boots" reached No. 1 on Billboard'''s Top R&B Songs chart and No. 3 on the Billboard Hot 100. The second single "Lick U Up" was a minor hit.Fever for da Flavor peaked at No. 1 on the Billboard Top R&B Albums chart and No. 16 on the Billboard'' 200. That same year, H-Town co-headlined the Coca-Cola Tour with SWV, which also included Shai and Silk.

Track listing
 "Introduction" - 0:25
 "Can't Fade da H" - 3:44
 "Treat U Right" - 4:11
 "Fever for da Flavor" - 4:34
 "Sex Me" - 3:49
 "H-Town Bounce" - 3:41
 "Keepin' My Composure" - 3:35
 "Interlude" (Keven "Dino" Conner, Solomon "Shazam" Conner, Bishop Burrell) - 1:10
 "Lick U Up" - 5:34
 "Knockin' da Boots" - 5:31
 "Won't U Come Back" - 4:40
 "Baby I Wanna" - 5:14

Personnel
Background vocals – Angee Griffin
Guitar – Gary King
Bass – Gary Williams
Arranged By – Bishop "Stick" Burrell, Sr., Keven "Dino" Conner, Darryl "G.I." Jackson, Solomon "Shazam" Conner (tracks: 7)
Executive Producer – Luther Campbell
Producer – Bishop "Stick" Burrell, Sr. (tracks: 1 to 6, 8 to 12), Jon "J. Swift" Catalon (tracks: 7), Pierre Ushay (tracks: 9 and 10)

Production from album liner notes.

Charts

Singles

See also
List of number-one R&B albums of 1993 (U.S.)

References

External links
Fever For Da Flavor (CD, Album) at Discogs
Fever For Da Flavor - Amazon.com

1993 debut albums
H-Town (band) albums